The 11th National Congress of the Kuomintang was the eleventh national congress of the Kuomintang, held on 12–18 November 1976 in Taipei, Taiwan. This is the first party congress after the Republic of China lost international recognition in 1971 and the death of Chiang Kai-shek in 1975.

Results
Congress members fully supported Chiang Ching-kuo to become the Chairperson of the Kuomintang after the death of the party chairperson Chiang Kai-shek on 5 April 1975.

See also
 Kuomintang

References

1976 conferences
1976 in Taiwan
National Congresses of the Kuomintang
Politics of Taiwan